is a former international table tennis player from Japan.

Table tennis career
From 1959 to 1963 she won several medals in singles, doubles, and team events in the World Table Tennis Championships and in the Asian Table Tennis Championships.

The six World Championship medals included five gold medals; one in the women's doubles with Taeko Namba in 1959, one in the mixed doubles with Koji Kimura in 1963 and three in the team event.

See also
 List of table tennis players
 List of World Table Tennis Championships medalists

References

Living people
Asian Games medalists in table tennis
Table tennis players at the 1958 Asian Games
Table tennis players at the 1962 Asian Games
Asian Games gold medalists for Japan
Asian Games silver medalists for Japan
Asian Games bronze medalists for Japan
Medalists at the 1958 Asian Games
Medalists at the 1962 Asian Games
Year of birth missing (living people)
Japanese female table tennis players